Gana is a village in the Anand district of the state of Gujarat in India. It is surrounded by the Anand, Sojitra, Borsad and Nadiad Tehsil.

References 

Villages in Anand district